Ruth Perkins may refer to:

Ruth Perkins, First Lady of California 1880 to 1883
Ruth Perkins, mother of fictional character Allison Perkins on TV soap opera One Life to Live